John Ulric Nef (Johann Ulrich Nef; June 14, 1862 – August 13, 1915) was a Swiss-born American chemist and the discoverer of the Nef reaction and Nef synthesis. He was a member of the American Academy of Arts and Sciences and the National Academy of Sciences.

Life
His parents emigrated from Switzerland to the United States, where Nef studied chemistry at Harvard University until 1884. Upon graduation, he joined Adolf von Baeyer at the University of Munich, where he received his Ph.D. in 1887.

He was a professor at Purdue University from 1887 till 1889 and at Clark University from 1889 till 1892. In 1892 Nef joined the newly formed University of Chicago as Professor of Chemistry, where he spent the rest of his academic career.

His son John Ulric Nef (1899–1988) became a Professor of Economic History and published several books.

Work
The discovery of the Nef reaction and the papers about divalent carbon (carbenes) were his major achievements.

See also
Phenylsodium

References

Biographical Note from the University of Chicago
Picture of Nef at MSU

External links
 

Swiss emigrants to the United States
Harvard College alumni
Ludwig Maximilian University of Munich alumni
Purdue University faculty
Clark University faculty
University of Chicago faculty
1862 births
1915 deaths
American chemists
Organic chemists
Members of the Royal Society of Sciences in Uppsala